Apati may refer to:
 Apati, Mawal, a village in Pune district, Maharashtra, India
 Apati, Ladakh, a village in Kargil district, Ladakh, India
 Apateu, a commune in Arad County, Romania
 István Apáti (born 1978), Hungarian jurist and politician